Ababu Namwamba E.G.H. (full name Ababu Tawfiq Pius Namwamba) is a Kenyan politician  and Cabinet secretary  for Youth Affairs , Sports  and the Arts , having been appointed by President William Ruto . He is an international lawyer trained in Nairobi and Washington, DC. Since 2016 he has been the leader of the Labour Party of Kenya . Ababu is also the immediate Former Chief Administrative Secretary of the Ministry of Foreign Affairs of the Republic of Kenya.

Biography
Ababu Namwamba was born in Jinja, Uganda to Kenyan parents on 23 December 1975, and raised in Uganda and later Kenya. Outside politics he is a public interest attorney specializing in international human rights and constitutional law, and a former columnist with leading newspapers in Kenya.

Legal practice
Ababu Namwamba holds a Bachelor of Laws degree from the University of Nairobi and a Master of Laws degree in International Law from American University Washington College of Law. Before his election to Parliament in 2007 on his first attempt, he had already built an impressive profile as a public interest attorney and crusader for accountable government. He was Chief Counsel at The Chambers of Justice, a public interest trust he founded in 2002 and ran alongside his law firm, Ababu Namwamba Attorneys-at-Law.

Namwamba is among pioneers in public interest litigation for the defenseless. In 2004 he won a landmark legal battle in which his client, a Kenyan-born Pakistani, had been wrongfully accused of terrorism. It was the first case of its kind in Kenya.

In 2003, he secured a historic ruling in a constitutional case that affirmed the right of children living with HIV/AIDS to attend public schools unfettered. He filed the case for Chambers of Justice and Nyumbani Children's Home after two schools in Ngong’ and Karen barred children from Nyumbani for their HIV status. This case won Namwamba international acclaim, winning him the 2004 Global Justice Award which he received in Amsterdam, Netherlands. He was inducted onto the roll of Young Global Leaders by the World Economic Forum in 2009.

As counsel for Swiss national Marianne Brynner, Namwamba was again in the public eye in 2004/5 as he played a central role in the last probe into the mysterious death of former Kenyan Foreign Affairs Minister, the late Dr. Robert Ouko.

This was also the period that saw Namwamba active on the international lobbying circuit, strongly advocating for international human rights, fair trade practices and debt relief for Africa through platforms like the World Social Forum in such far flung locations as Mumbai, India and Porto Alegre, Brazil. Locally, he pressed for responsible governance through the unique "After the Promise" annual governance report card. An avid reader and consummate writer, the Hubert Humphrey Fellow/Fulbright alumnus was also a regular columnist with the Sunday Nation and later Standard on Sunday, Kenya's top two newspapers, where he wrote weekly political analysis for over five years.

Community service
In 2003, he initiated the Ababu Namwamba Foundation, a charity that supports education, talent growth and economic empowerment for hundreds of young Kenyans. He calls the foundation his ‘payback’ to Kenya, himself a beneficiary of a Jomo Kenyatta Foundation scholarship in high school. The foundation offers scholarships to bright students from economically challenged backgrounds, runs a mentorship program for students, supports development of sporting talents and works with women and youth groups on income-generating activities.

Political career
Namwamba was first elected to parliament in the 2007 Kenyan parliamentary election as a member of the Orange Democratic Movement (ODM), representing Budalang'i Constituency in the National Assembly of Kenya. He was Parliamentary Secretary of the ODM from 2008 to 2013, and served as Minister for Sports and Youth Affairs from 2012 until the ODM lost office in the 2013 election.

In 2016, Namwamba quit ODM where he was serving as secretary general. He felt that the party leader Raila Odinga (who had stood for the presidency twice) was no longer capable of convincing voters to support him. He joined the newly relaunched Labour Party of Kenya, and since September 2016 he has been the leader of the Labour Party. In March 2017 the Labour Party announced that it would support the presidential candidacy of Uhuru Kenyatta in the election of August 2017. Namwamba lost his Budalang'i seat in that election.

In January 2018, Namwamba was nominated to the position of Chief Administrative Secretary in the Ministry of Foreign Affairs  and was sworn into office in March 2018.

References

External links
 Kenyan Labour Party

Living people
Kenyan Luhya people
Orange Democratic Movement politicians
Members of the National Assembly (Kenya)
Year of birth missing (living people)